What Did He Say? is the second solo album released by bassist Victor Wooten.

Track listing
1. "Yo Victa" – 0:07

2. "What Did He Say?" – 3:20
Victor Wooten - Bass, Lead and background vocals
JD Blair - Drums, Background vocals
Cherokee - Background vocals

3. "What You Won't Do for Love" – 4:43
Victor Wooten - Bass
JD Blair - Drums

4. "Cherokee" – 1:49
Victor Wooten - Bass
James Genus - Acoustic Bass
Raymond Massey - Drums
Futch - Swinging ride cymbal
Regi Wooten - Guitar
Joseph Wooten - Piano
Rudy Wooten - Alto Sax
Jeff Coffin - Tenor Sax
Rod McGaha - Trumpet
Cherokee - Vocals

5. "Don't Wanna Cry" – 5:07
Victor Wooten - Bass, Vocals, Music Programming
Ann McCrary & Robert Bailey - Background Vocals

6. "The Lonliest Monk" – 	4:36
Victor Wooten - Bass, Cello, Percussion, Vocals, Piano
JD Blair - Drums

7. "A Chance" – 2:54
Victor Wooten - Bass
JD Blair - Drums, Drum programming, Bass
8. "Radio W-OO-10" – 	1:06
Michael Kott & Matt Smith - Vocals

9. "Norwegian Wood" – 4:52
Victor Wooten - Bass

10. "Bro John" – 4:18
Pete Wooten - Lead Vocals
Victor Wooten - Bass, Background Vocals, Stomps and Claps
JD Blair - Drums, Stomps and Claps
Holly Wooten and Kurt storey - Stomps and Claps

11. "Naima" – 5:57
Oteil Burbridge - Electric bass
Regi Wooten - Nylon String Guitar
JD Blair - Drums
Jim  Roberts - Percussion
Victor Wooten - Acoustic Bass

12. "Sometimes I Laugh" – 3:20
Victor Wooten - Bass
Laughter provided by Jessie and Justice Wooten, Willow Robillard, Jason and Derek Weiman, David Shea, Josh Bartley, Nikki and Ben Curtis, Kari and Elii Morse, Sophie Bell, Baylane Hayens, Holly Wooten

13. "My Life" – 4:45
Victor Wooten - Bass, Guitar, Lead and Background vocals
JD Blair - Drums, Background vocals
Kurt Storey - Background vocals

14. "The Sojourn of Arjuna" – 6:29

15. "Buzz Ntro" – 0:31

16. "A Little Buzz" – 2:46

17. "Kids Didn't Change" – 0:54

18. "Heaven Is Where the Heart Is" – 5:03

Personnel

Aashid – Vocals
J.D. Blair – Drums
Future Man – Vocals, Voices
Michael Kott – Vocals, Voices
Park Law – Vocals
Will Lee – Vocals
Malcolm X – Vocals, Voices
Dorothy G. Wooten – Vocals, Voices
Elijah "Pete" Wooten – Vocals, Voices
Joe Wooten – Vocals
Victor Wooten – Bass, Arranger, Vocals, Voices, Producer, Liner Notes, Tenor Bass

Production

David Bennett  – Management
Steve Lowery  – Illustrations, Drawing
Mark Mandelbaum  – Engineer
Chris Milfred  – Mastering
Griffin Norman  – Design
Keith Odle  – Mixing
Kurt Storey  – Vocals, Engineer, Mastering, Mixing
Mark Tucker  – Photography

References

1997 albums
Victor Wooten albums